The following is a list of recurring Saturday Night Live characters and sketches introduced between September 25, 1999, and May 20, 2000, the twenty-fifth season of SNL.

The Boston Teens

A Jimmy Fallon and Rachel Dratch sketch. Debuted November 13, 1999.

Nadeen
A Cheri Oteri sketch. Debuted November 13, 1999.  Nadeen would appear as a service employee of some sort (a hospital admitting nurse, a fast food counter clerk, etc.).  Her catchphrase was "Simmah down now!"  However, Nadeen was always by far the most wound up and hyper character in the sketch, the one most in need of "simmering down".

Appearances:

Nov. 13, 1999: Host Garth Brooks.  Nadeen works the returns counter at a department store.
Feb. 12, 2000:  Host Julianna Margulies.  Nadeen works as an emergency room admitting nurse.
Apr 15, 2000:  Host Tobey Maguire.  Nadeen works a fast food counter.

Nick Burns, Your Company's Computer Guy
A Jimmy Fallon sketch. Debuted November 20, 1999.  Nick Burns (Fallon) looked like an archetypal nerd (dirty unkempt hair, pagers, pocket protector, etc.) and was an IT Support guy at a large company.  He would nastily mock anyone who asked for his assistance in fixing a problem with their computer.  His catchphrases were a sarcastic, "YOU'RE WELCOME," a loud, obnoxious, "MOVE!!", commanding the person asking for his help to get out of their desk chair so he could sit in it to fix the problem with their computer, and "WAS THAT SO HARD?"
 Season 25, Episode 6 (November 20, 1999) Jennifer Aniston
 Season 25, Episode 9 (January 8, 2000) Jamie Foxx
 Season 25, Episode 20 (May 20, 2000) Jackie Chan
 Season 26, Episode 5 (November 11, 2000) Calista Flockhart.  Flockhart played a new IT Support employee who was essentially a female version of Nick Burns.  By the end of the sketch, she and Nick had taken strong romantic interest in each other.
 Season 27, Episode 6 (November 17, 2001) Billy Bob Thornton.  Thornton played Nick Burns' father, essentially an older version of him.

Jacob Silj
Jacob Silj is a Will Ferrell character who suffers from 'Voice Immodulation Syndrome', a disease which makes him unable to control the volume or inflection of his voice. Silj begins each segment by attempting to offer serious commentary on a current event, but inevitably gets interrupted by the Weekend Update anchor, who can't stand his loud, relentless monotone. Silj then begins to lecture the anchor about Voice Immodulation Syndrome, and describe situations that make the disease particularly unbearable (like praying in church, or soothing a baby to sleep). Silj has variously stated that the disease affects 700 or 6 people each year, or "over zero people in the United States alone,", and is apparently caused by a late birth and exposure to gold dust. The character debuted December 4, 1999.

Appearances:

Dec. 4, 1999: Host Christina Ricci.  Season 25, Episode 7 with Weekend Update Correspondent Colin Quinn.
Apr. 8, 2000:  Host Christopher Walken.  Season 25, Episode 16 with Weekend Update Correspondent Colin Quinn.
Jan. 20, 2001:  Host Mena Suvari.  Season 26, Episode 10 with Weekend Update Correspondents Jimmy Fallon & Tina Fey.
Apr. 14, 2001: Host Renee Zellweger. Season 26, Episode 17 with Weekend Update Correspondents Jimmy Fallon & Tina Fey.
Jan. 27, 2018: Host Will Ferrell. Season 43, Episode 12 with Weekend Update Correspondents Colin Jost & Michael Che.

Sally O'Malley
Molly Shannon portrayed Sally O'Malley, a proud 50-year-old woman sporting a red jump-suit and bouffant hairstyle. Her catchphrase was, "I like to kick, and stretch and KICK!! I'm 50!!"  Her common action was to pull her pants up high, and then kick and stretch energetically. She believed herself to be an extraordinarily youthful 50, and although energetic and spunky, in many ways, especially her physical appearance, she was an archetypal middle aged woman. In each sketch, she was auditioning or interviewing for a job that was looking for a much younger woman, but she would always end up getting the job.

Appearances:

Dec. 11, 1999: Host Danny DeVito. Sally auditions for The Rockettes.
Feb 19, 2000: Host Ben Affleck. Sally enrolls in the police academy.
Apr. 8, 2000: Host Christopher Walken. Sally wins a beauty contest.
Feb. 17, 2001: Host Sean Hayes.  Sally talks her way into a fashion show as a runway model.
May 12, 2007: Host Molly Shannon. In this installment of the sketch, which takes place in the world depicted on The Sopranos, Sally gets hired as a stripper at Bada Bing! 
May 8, 2010: Host Betty White.  Sally meets a similarly spunky woman (White) who's obsessed with the fact that she's 90 years old.  She has her own catch phrase:  "I like to stand (she stands), and bend (she bends slightly at the waist), and sit! (She sits back down, having had enough activity for the moment.) I'm 90!" (Shannon appears in cameo.)

Jasper Hahn
Portrayed by Horatio Sanz, Jasper Hahn was touted as an illustrator for children's books. During his appearance, he would begin drawing what would initially be perceived as something phallic. Colin Quinn, and later Jimmy Fallon, would bristle and try to stop him, but the drawing would usually end up as a moose or other animal with a phallic-shaped nose or proboscis. Debuted January 8, 2000.

Dr. Beamen
A Will Ferrell sketch. Debuted January 15, 2000.

Joy Lipton
Played by Cheri Oteri, Lipton is the owner of The Erotic Attic boutique with a quavering voice and glasses. Appeared in the Weekend Update segment, Lipton promotes erotic material she created while giving advice on how to use them. She usually talks to the anchor ("Hey Colin!") rather than the audience, takes off her dress at the end of each sketch to unveil an erotic cloth underneath and then lies down the anchor's desk.

Season 25, episode 12: Host Julianna Margulies - February 12, 2000. Lipton gives Valentine’s Day gift hints.
Season 25, episode 17: Host Tobey Maguire - April 15, 2000. Lipton shows some of her own creations, regarding National Lingerie Week

The Bloder Brothers
The Bloder brothers, Kip (Fallon) and Wayne (Chris Parnell), make obnoxious jokes, no matter what situation, and laughing incessantly at themselves. Their laughter is characteristically low-key and sounds extremely forced. They usually go back and forth, taking turns making jokes, which are generally little more than puns or comic references based on whatever situation they are in, much to the chagrin of whoever happens to be listening to them. They often try to pick up women, but they appear to be uncomfortable and their constant joking usually gets in the way. The more uneasy they appear to be, the more they joke and laugh. When thoroughly defeated, they occasionally go back and forth between crying and laughing (apparently at nothing).  In one sketch, their father, Kurt Bloder (played by Jon Stewart), appears and exhibits behavior just like the two.

Woodrow the Homeless Man
A Tracy Morgan sketch. Debuted May 13, 2000.  This sketch always aired on episodes hosted by attractive, young female celebrities.  Tracy Morgan played Woodrow, a homeless man who lived in the sewer, was filthy, smelled terrible, and was psychotically disconnected from reality in disturbing ways.  The theme of the sketches was that the young, attractive host of the episode (always playing herself, not an impression of someone else or a fictional person) would be oblivious to his filth and psychosis and fall in love with him.

Morgan reprises his role as Woodrow on the October 17, 2015 episode, serving as a life coach for Weekend Update character Willie.

Appearances:
May 13, 2000 - Host: Britney Spears
October 14, 2000 - Host: Kate Hudson
October 17, 2015 - Host: Tracy Morgan

References

Lists of recurring Saturday Night Live characters and sketches
Saturday Night Live in the 2000s
Saturday Night Live in the 1990s
Saturday Night Live
Saturday Night Live